Lalo Ríos (7 February 1927 – 7 March 1973) was a Mexican-born American actor best known for his lead role in The Ring (1952) as Tommy.

Biography 
Lalo Ríos was born on February 7, 1927, in San Miguelito, Sonora, Mexico. At the age of 9 he moved to East Los Angeles, California, with his family. He graduated from Abraham Lincoln High School.

During Ríos' work as a carpenter he got his first acting role with the Paramount film The Lawless (1950). The film cast Ríos as a young Mexican who faces a racist lynch mob in a small North California town. Since his start, his career spanned nearly twenty years. In 1952, Ríos was then cast in his most well-known role as "Tommy", in The Ring (1952), in which he played the lead actor and protagonist.  Ríos was also known for certain relevance in films such as Big Leaguer (1953), and Touch of Evil (1958). He eventually ended his career in film in 1962, with Lonely Are the Brave.

After ending his career in film, Ríos began to focus solely on television. This was a format with which he was familiar, due to his initial inclusion in Westinghouse Desilu Playhouse in 1958. His casting with the series was short lived, appearing in only two episodes, but assisted him in creating a platform to sell his craft. After 1966, he participated in multiple television series, such as Laredo (1966) and Marcus Welby, M.D. (1968). Marcus Welby was the last series in which he participated, before he left American television.

Ríos died in Los Angeles on March 7, 1973.

Filmography

Television

References

External links 
 
 Films and TV: Lalo Rios - Movies

1927 births
1973 deaths
American male actors of Mexican descent
Male actors from Sonora
American male film actors
American male television actors
20th-century American male actors
Male actors from Los Angeles County, California
Mexican emigrants to the United States
People from East Los Angeles, California
Deaths from liver disease